Melekine is a village in the Mariupol Raion of Donetsk Oblast,  from Mariupol.

Melekine is a sea resort and an administrative center of Melekine village council that combines several neighboring villages. It was established sometime in the 19th century as a fisherman company by a landowner Meleko. With the establishment of the Soviet regime in the area, the village was reformed into a fishermen collective farm.

Today Melekine (until 2009 Melekyne) has numerous sea resorts that stretch along the coast of the Sea of Azov.

The village was mentioned in the song "Melekino" of a local Russian-Ukrainian rap-group.

Monuments and memorials 
There is a gazebo on the road, on the outskirts of the village, and a memorial sign dedicated to the founders of the village of Melekine.
 Existing monuments

References

External links
 Brief description

Villages in Mariupol Raion
Fishing in Ukraine